George Louis Palmella Busson du Maurier (6 March 1834 – 8 October 1896) was a Franco-British cartoonist and writer known for work in Punch and a Gothic novel Trilby, featuring the character Svengali. His son was the actor Sir Gerald du Maurier. The writers Angela du Maurier and Dame Daphne du Maurier and the artist Jeanne du Maurier were all granddaughters of George. He was also father of Sylvia Llewelyn Davies and grandfather of the five boys who inspired J. M. Barrie's Peter Pan.

Early life
George du Maurier was born in Paris, France, son of Louis-Mathurin Busson du Maurier and wife Ellen Clarke, daughter of the Regency courtesan Mary Anne Clarke. He was brought up to believe his aristocratic grandparents had fled from France during the Revolution, leaving vast estates behind, to live in England as émigrés. In fact, du Maurier's grandfather, Robert-Mathurin Busson, was a tradesman who left Paris, France, in 1789 to avoid charges of fraud and later changed the family name to the grander-sounding du Maurier.

Du Maurier studied art in Paris, France, in the studio of Charles Gleyre, and moved to Antwerp, Belgium, where he lost the vision in his left eye. He consulted an oculist in Düsseldorf, Rhineland, Prussia, German Confederation. He was reportedly studying chemistry at University College, London, in 1851. He is recorded in the 1861 England Census as a lodger at 85 Newman St in Marylebone.

He met Emma Wightwick in 1853 and married her a decade later, on 3 January 1863, at St Marylebone, Westminster. Moving frequently over the course of their marriage, the couple first settled in Hampstead in 1869, initially at Gang Moor near the Whitestone Pond for three years, before moving to 27 Church Row and later at New Grove House in 1881. In 1891, the family is recorded as residing at 2 Porchester Rd in Paddington. They had five children: Beatrix (known as Trixy), Guy, Sylvia, Marie Louise (known as May) and Gerald.

Career

Cartoonist
Du Maurier became a member of staff at the British satirical magazine Punch in 1865, drawing two cartoons a week. His commonest targets were the affected manners of Victorian society, the bourgeoisie and members of Britain's growing middle class in particular. His most enduring cartoon, True Humility (1895), popularised the expressions "good in parts" and "a curate's egg". In it, a bishop addresses a humble curate, whom he has invited to breakfast: "I'm afraid you've got a bad egg, Mr. Jones." The curate replies, "Oh no, my Lord, I assure you – parts of it are excellent!" The gag was not original to du Maurier, however, as it had appeared in a similar cartoon a few months earlier in Judy, a less widely read competitor to Punch.<ref name=QI>{{Cite web |url=https://quoteinvestigator.com/2019/04/04/egg/|title=The Curate''s Egg: Parts of It Are Excellent|website=Quote Investigator|language=en|access-date=2019-03-05}}</ref> In an earlier (1884) cartoon, du Maurier coined the expression "bedside manner", with which he satirised medical care. Another of his notable cartoons depicted a fanciful videophone conversation in 1879, using a device he called "Edison's telephonoscope".

While producing black-and-white drawings for Punch, du Maurier created illustrations for several other popular periodicals: Harper's, The Graphic, The Illustrated Times, The Cornhill Magazine, and the religious periodical Good Words. Furthermore, he did illustrations for the serialisation of Charles Warren Adams's The Notting Hill Mystery, which is often seen as the first detective story of novel length to have appeared in English. Among several other novels he illustrated was Misunderstood by Florence Montgomery in 1873.

Writer

His deteriorating eyesight caused du Maurier to reduce his involvement with Punch in 1891 and settle in Hampstead, where he wrote three novels. His first, Peter Ibbetson (1891), was a modest success at the time and later adapted for stage and screen, most notably in a 1935 film, and as an opera.

His second novel, Trilby, published in 1894, fitted into the gothic horror genre that was undergoing a revival. Hugely popular, it tells of a poor artist's model, Trilby O'Ferrall, transformed into a diva under the spell of an evil musical genius, Svengali. Soap, songs, dances, toothpaste, and even the city of Trilby, Florida, were named after her, as was the variety of soft felt hat with an indented crown worn in the London stage dramatisation of the novel. The plot inspired Gaston Leroux's 1910 novel Phantom of the Opera and innumerable works derived from it. Du Maurier eventually came to dislike the persistent attention the novel was given.

The third novel was a long, largely autobiographical work entitled The Martian, published posthumously in 1898.

Death and legacy
Du Maurier died on 8 October 1898 and was buried in St John-at-Hampstead churchyard in Hampstead. The success of his writings and illustrations allowed du Maurier to leave a then staggering amount of £47,555 in his will.

Du Maurier was a close friend of Henry James, the novelist; their relationship was fictionalised in David Lodge's Author, Author (2004).

BibliographyPeter Ibbetson (1891), also 1917 play; adapted in 1935 by Henry Hathaway into a film starring Gary Cooper; also adapted as an opera by Deems Taylor in 1931Trilby (1894) published first as a magazine serial in 8 partsThe Martian (1898)Social Pictorial Satire (1898) (Harper's New Monthly Magazine)

Film adaptationsTrilby (1914), starring Herbert Beerbohm Tree and Viva Birkett Trilby (1915), starring Wilton Lackaye and Clara Kimball YoungForever (1921), starring Wallace Reid and Elsie FergusonTrilby (1923), starring Arthur Edmund Carewe and Andrée LafayetteSvengali (1927), starring Paul Wegener and Anita DorrisSvengali (1931), starring John Barrymore and Marian Marsh Peter Ibbetson (1935), starring Gary Cooper and Ann Harding The Guilt of Janet Ames (1947), starring Melvyn Douglas and Rosalind Russell Svengali (1954), starring Donald Wolfit and Hildegard KnefSvengali (1983), starring Peter O'Toole and Jodie Foster

See also
Trilbymania

References

Further reading
Simon Cooke and Paul Goldman. George Du Maurier: Illustrator, Author, Critic. Beyond Svengali. Routledge, 2016
Richard Kelly. George du Maurier. Twayne, 1983
Richard Kelly. The Art of George du Maurier. Scolar Press, 1996
Leonée Ormond. George du Maurier.'' Routledge & Kegan Paul, London, 1969
"Du Maurier", a poem by Florence Earle Coates first published in 1898

External links

Dictionary of National Biography, 1901 supplement: Du Maurier, George Louis Palmella Busson

Works by or about George du Maurier at HathiTrust
Works by or about George du Maurier at GoogleBooks

A gallery of George du Maurier works for Punch magazine
George du Maurier at The Victorian Web
George du Maurier at Lambiek.net

George du Maurier's cartoon Love-Agony satirizing the Aesthetic Movement and Oscar Wilde.
George du Maurier cartoons at CartoonStock (Commercial site)
Telephonoscope, a cartoon of a television/videophone in 1879

Blue Plaque at 91, Great Russell Street, Bloomsbury, London
George du Maurier at University of Exeter Special Collections

1834 births
1896 deaths
French emigrants to the United Kingdom
Artists from Paris
British cartoonists
Punch (magazine) cartoonists
Burials at St John-at-Hampstead
19th-century British writers
Writers of Gothic fiction
George
Victorian novelists